The 2022 season was the Wigan Warriors's 42nd consecutive season playing in England's top division of rugby league. During the season, they competed in the Super League XXVII and the 2022 Challenge Cup.

Preseason  friendlies

Super League

Regular season

Matches

All fixtures are subject to change

Table

Play-offs

Challenge Cup

Transfers

Gains

Losses

Squad

Notes

References

Wigan Warriors seasons
Wigan Warriors